The Surrey County Rugby Football Union is the union responsible for rugby union in the county of Surrey, England, and is one of the constituent bodies of the national Rugby Football Union having been formed in 1879.

History

Early years of County representative team
The earliest recorded game played by a team purporting to represent Surrey under rugby union auspices was played before the Surrey County Club has been formed. This was played on 21 February 1878 against Middlesex and won by Surrey with a try scored by AS Trevor.

Formation of the County Club
On 22 December 1879, a meeting was held at the York Hotel, on Waterloo Road, South London (then in Surrey), at which the County Club was formed. Two fixtures were played that season. The first was against Middlesex which turned out to be an easy win for Surrey. However, their confidence was put into check when they were soundly beaten by Yorkshire. Another match with Middlesex was played at Old Deer Park on 6 December 1880 with the result of each fifteen scoring one goal, in what was described as a ″splendidly-contested game″.

County side

Honours
County Championship finals (2 wins);

County Championship Shield finals (4 wins);

County Championship Plate finals (1 win);

Notable players for the County side

Many notable players have represented Surrey. The most appearances in County Championship games for the Surrey side have been by:

Bob Hiller (Harlequins) – 68
Bob Lloyd (Harlequins) – 46
Stanley Couchman (Old Cranleighans) – 45
Ted Priest (Old Alleynians) – 39

Other famous players include:
George Doherty (former captain of Ireland)
Jonny Wilkinson
 Fraser Gore

Presidents
The 2008–09 president of Surrey RFU is John Vale.

Affiliated clubs
There are currently 73 full member adult clubs affiliated with the Surrey RFU, most of which have teams at both senior and junior level and are based in Surrey and parts of London.  Many of the London-based sides are also members of the Middlesex RFU.

Arioch Crusaders
Barnes
Bec Old Boys
Camberley
Chipstead
Chobham
Cobham
Cranleigh RFC
Croydon
Dorking
Ealing Trailfinders
Economicals
Egham Hollowegians
Esher
Effingham & Leatherhead
Farnham
Guildford
Guildfordians
Haslemere
Horley
KCS Old Boys
Kew Occasionals
Kingston
Kingston University
Ironsides
Law Society
London Irish
London Irish Wild Geese
Lightwater
London Exiles
Merton
Mitcham & Carshalton
Old Alleynians
Old Blues
Old Caterhamians
Old Cranleighans
Old Emanuel
Old Freemen's
Old Georgians
Old Haileyburians
Old Johnian
Old Oundelians
Old Pauline
Old Reigatian
Old Rutlishians
Old Suttonians
Old Tiffinians
Old Tonbridgians
Old Walcountians
Old Wellingtonians
Old Whitgiftian
Old Wimbledonians
OR Serpents
Purley John Fisher
Racal Decca
Raynes Park
Reeds Weybridge
Reigate
Richmond
Rosslyn Park
Royal Holloway University
South Godstone
Southwark Tigers
Streatham-Croydon
Sutton & Epsom
Teddington
Trinity
Wandsworthians
Warlingham
Weybridge Vandals
Wimbledon
Woking
Worth Old Boys

County club competitions
The Surrey RFU currently runs the following club competitions for club sides based in Surrey and parts of London:

Leagues
Surrey 1 – league ranked at tier 9 of the English rugby union system 
Surrey 2 – tier 10 league
Surrey 3 – tier 11 league
Surrey 4 – tier 12 league

Cups
Surrey Cup – founded in 1890, for local clubs at tier 5 of the English rugby union system 
Surrey Trophy – founded in 2009, for clubs at tiers 6–8
Surrey Shield – founded in 1998, for clubs at tiers 9–10
Surrey Bowl – founded in 2006, for clubs at tiers 11–12

Discontinued Competitions
Surrey 5 - tier 12 league that ran between 1989 and 1992

Notes

See also
London & SE Division
English rugby union system

References

External links
 

Rugby union governing bodies in England
1879 establishments in England
Sports organizations established in 1879
Rugby union in Surrey